Serkan Atak (born 3 January 1984) is a Turkish footballer who plays as a winger. Raised in the youth ranks of FC Bayern Munich, he represented Turkish national teams in various youth levels.

References

External links
 
 Profile at footballstats.co.uk
 Profile at TFF.org 
 

1984 births
Living people
Turkish footballers
Turkey under-21 international footballers
German people of Turkish descent
Gaziantepspor footballers
FC Bayern Munich II players
Turkey youth international footballers
Süper Lig players
TFF First League players
Mediterranean Games medalists in football
Association football midfielders
Mediterranean Games silver medalists for Turkey
Competitors at the 2005 Mediterranean Games
People from Eichstätt (district)
Sportspeople from Upper Bavaria
Footballers from Bavaria